The sensitive high-resolution ion microprobe (also sensitive high mass-resolution ion microprobe or SHRIMP) is a large-diameter, double-focusing secondary ion mass spectrometer (SIMS) sector instrument produced by Australian Scientific Instruments in Canberra, Australia. Similar to the IMS 1270-1280-1300 large-geometry ion microprobes produced by CAMECA, Gennevilliers, France and like other SIMS instruments, the SHRIMP microprobe bombards a sample under vacuum with a beam of primary ions that sputters secondary ions that are focused, filtered, and measured according to their energy and mass.

The SHRIMP is primarily used for geological and geochemical applications. It can measure the isotopic and elemental abundances in minerals at a 10 to 30 μm-diameter scale and with a depth resolution of 1–5 μm. Thus, SIMS method is well-suited for the analysis of complex minerals, as often found in metamorphic terrains, some igneous rocks, and for relatively rapid analysis of statistical valid sets of detrital minerals from sedimentary rocks. The most common application of the instrument is in uranium-thorium-lead geochronology, although the SHRIMP can be used to measure some other isotope ratio measurements (e.g., δ7Li or δ11B) and trace element abundances.

History and scientific impact
The SHRIMP originated in 1973 with a proposal by Prof. Bill Compston, trying to build an ion microprobe at the Research School of Earth Sciences of the Australian National University that exceeded the sensitivity and resolution of ion probes available at the time in order to analyse individual mineral grains. Optic designer Steve Clement based the prototype instrument (now referred to as 'SHRIMP-I') on a design by Matsuda which minimised aberrations in transmitting ions through the various sectors. The instrument was built from 1975 and 1977 with testing and redesigning from 1978. The first successful geological applications occurred in 1980.

The first major scientific impact was the discovery of Hadean (>4000 million year old) zircon grains at Mt. Narryer in Western Australia and then later at the nearby Jack Hills. These results and the SHRIMP analytical method itself were initially questioned but subsequent conventional analysis were partially confirmed. SHRIMP-I also pioneered ion microprobe studies of titanium, hafnium and sulfur isotopic systems.

Growing interest from commercial companies and other academic research groups, notably Prof. John de Laeter of Curtin University (Perth, Western Australia), led to the project in 1989 to build a commercial version of the instrument, the SHRIMP-II, in association with ANUTECH, the Australian National University's commercial arm. Refined ion optic designs in the mid-1990s prompted development and construction of the SHRIMP-RG (Reverse Geometry) with improved mass resolution. Further advances in design have also led to multiple ion collection systems (already introduced in the market by a French company years before), negative-ion stable isotope measurements and on-going work in developing a dedicated instrument for light stable isotopes.

Fifteen SHRIMP instruments have now been installed around the world and SHRIMP results have been reported in more than 2000 peer reviewed scientific papers. SHRIMP is an important tool for understanding early Earth history having analysed some of the oldest terrestrial material including the Acasta Gneiss and further extending the age of zircons from the Jack Hills  and the oldest impact crater on the planet. Other significant milestones include the first U/Pb ages for lunar zircon and Martian apatite dating. More recent uses include the determination of Ordovician sea surface temperature, the timing of snowball Earth events and development of stable isotope techniques.

Design and operation

Primary column
In a typical U-Pb geochronology analytical mode, a beam of (O2)1− primary ions are produced from a high-purity oxygen gas discharge in the hollow Ni cathode of a duoplasmatron. The ions are extracted from the plasma and accelerated at 10 kV. The primary column uses Köhler illumination to produce a uniform ion density across the target spot. The spot diameter can vary from ~5 µm to over 30 µm as required. Typical ion beam density on the sample is ~10 pA/µm2 and an analysis of 15–20 minutes creates an ablation pit of less than 1 µm.

Sample chamber
The primary beam is 45° incident to the plane of the sample surface with secondary ions extracted at 90° and accelerated at 10 kV. Three quadrupole lenses focus the secondary ions onto a source slit and the design aims to maximise transmission of ions rather than preserving an ion image unlike other ion probe designs. A Schwarzschild objective lens provides reflected-light direct microscopic viewing of the sample during analysis.

Electrostatic analyzer
The secondary ions are filtered and focussed according to their kinetic energy by a 1272 mm radius 90° electrostatic sector. A mechanically-operated slit provides fine-tuning of the energy spectrum transmitted into the magnetic sector and an electrostatic quadrupole lens is used to reduce aberrations in transmitting the ions to the magnetic sector.

Magnetic sector
The electromagnet has a 1000 mm radius through 72.5° to focus the secondary ions according to their mass/charge ratio according to the principles of the Lorentz force. Essentially, the path of a less massive ion will have a greater curvature through the magnetic field than the path of a more massive ion. Thus, altering the current in the electromagnet focuses a particular mass species at the detector.

Detectors
The ions pass through a collector slit in the focal plane of the magnetic sector and the collector assembly can be moved along an axis to optimise the focus of a given isotopic species. In typical U-Pb zircon analysis, a single secondary electron multiplier is used for ion counting.

Vacuum system
Turbomolecular pumps evacuate the entire beam path of the SHRIMP to maximise transmission and reduce contamination. The sample chamber also employs a cryopump to trap contaminants, especially water. Typical pressures inside the SHRIMP are between ~7 x 10−9 mbar in the detector and ~1 x 10−6 mbar in the primary column.

Mass resolution and sensitivity
In normal operations, the SHRIMP achieves mass resolution of 5000 with sensitivity >20 counts/sec/ppm/nA for lead from zircon.

Applications

Isotope dating
For U-Th-Pb geochronology a beam of primary ions (O2)1− are accelerated and collimated towards the target where it sputters "secondary" ions from the sample. These secondary ions are accelerated along the instrument where the various isotopes of uranium, lead and thorium are measured successively, along with reference peaks for Zr2O+, ThO+ and UO+. Since the sputtering yield differs between ion species and relative sputtering yield increases or decreases with time depending on the ion species (due to increasing crater depth, charging effects and other factors), the measured relative isotopic abundances do not relate to the real relative isotopic abundances in the target. Corrections are determined by analysing unknowns and reference material (matrix-matched material of known isotopic composition), and determining an analytical-session specific calibration factor.

SHRIMP instruments around the world

References

External links
 Founding SHRIMP Lab at Australian National University
 Australian Scientific Instruments

Geochronological dating methods
Mass spectrometry